is a Japanese light novel series written by Reki Kawahara and illustrated by abec. The series takes place in the then-near future and focuses on protagonists Kazuto "Kirito" Kirigaya and Asuna Yuuki as they play through various virtual reality MMORPG worlds. Kawahara originally wrote the series as a web novel on his website from 2002 to 2008. The light novels began publication on ASCII Media Works' Dengeki Bunko imprint from April 10, 2009, with a spin-off series launching in October 2012. The series has spawned twelve manga adaptations published by ASCII Media Works and Kadokawa. The novels and the manga adaptations have been licensed for release in North America by Yen Press.

An anime television series produced by A-1 Pictures, known simply as Sword Art Online, aired in Japan between July and December 2012, with a television film Sword Art Online: Extra Edition airing on December 31, 2013, and a second season, titled Sword Art Online II, airing between July and December 2014. An animated film titled Sword Art Online The Movie: Ordinal Scale, featuring an original story by Kawahara, premiered in Japan and Southeast Asia on February 18, 2017, and was released in the United States on March 9, 2017. A spin-off anime series titled Sword Art Online Alternative Gun Gale Online premiered in April 2018, while a third season titled Sword Art Online: Alicization aired from October 2018 to September 2020. An anime film adaptation of Sword Art Online: Progressive titled Sword Art Online Progressive: Aria of a Starless Night premiered on October 30, 2021. A second film titled Sword Art Online Progressive: Scherzo of Deep Night premiered on October 22, 2022. A live-action series based on the light novels is set to be produced by Netflix. Six video games based on the series have been released for multiple consoles.

Sword Art Online has received widespread commercial success, with the light novels having over 30 million copies sold worldwide. The light novel series had good reviews, mainly on later arcs, while other series like Progressive were praised since the beginning. The anime series has received mixed to positive reviews, with praise for its animation, musical score and exploration of the psychological aspects of virtual reality, but criticisms for its pacing and writing.

Synopsis

Setting
The light novel series spans several virtual reality worlds, beginning with the game, Sword Art Online (SAO), which is set in a world known as Aincrad. Each world is built on a game engine called the World Seed, which was initially developed specifically for SAO by Akihiko Kayaba, but was later duplicated for Alfheim Online (ALO), and later willed to Kirito, who had it leaked online with the successful intention of reviving the virtual reality industry. A third world known as Gun Gale Online (GGO) appears in the third arc and is stylized as an FPS game instead of an RPG, and is the main setting of Alternative Gun Gale Online. It was created using the World Seed by an American company. A fourth world appears in the fourth arc known as the Underworld (UW). The world itself was created using the World Seed as a base, but it is as realistic as the real world due to using many powerful government resources to keep it running.

Plot

In 2022, a virtual reality massively multiplayer online role-playing game (VRMMORPG) called Sword Art Online (SAO) was released. With the NerveGear, a helmet that stimulates the user's five senses via their brain, players can experience and control their in-game characters with their minds. Both the game and the NerveGear were created by Akihiko Kayaba. On November 6, 10,000 players log into SAOs mainframe cyberspace for the first time, only to discover that they are unable to log out. Kayaba appears and tells the players that they must beat all 100 floors of Aincrad, a steel castle which is the setting of SAO, if they wish to be free. He also states that those who suffer in-game deaths or forcibly remove the NerveGear out-of-game will suffer real-life deaths.

A player named Kazuto "Kirito" Kirigaya is one of 1,000 testers in the game's previous closed beta. With the advantage of previous VR gaming experience and a drive to protect other beta testers from discrimination, he isolates himself from the greater groups and plays the game alone, bearing the mantle of "beater", a portmanteau of "beta tester" and "cheater". As the players progress through the game Kirito eventually befriends a young girl named Asuna Yuuki, forming a relationship with and later marrying her in-game. After the duo discover the identity of Kayaba's secret ID, who was playing as "Heathcliff", the leader of the guild Asuna joined in, they confront and destroy him, freeing themselves and the other players from the game.

In the real world, Kazuto discovers that 300 SAO players, including Asuna, remain trapped in their NerveGear. As he goes to the hospital to see Asuna, he meets Asuna's father Shouzou Yuuki who is asked by an associate of his, Nobuyuki Sugou, to make a decision, which Sugou later reveals to be his marriage with Asuna, angering Kazuto. Several months later, he is informed by Agil, another SAO survivor, that a figure similar to Asuna was spotted on "The World Tree" in another VRMMORPG cyberspace called Alfheim Online (ALO). Assisted in-game by his cousin and adoptive sister Suguha "Leafa" Kirigaya and Yui, a navigation pixie (originally an AI from SAO), he quickly learns that the trapped players in ALO are part of a plan conceived by Sugou to perform illegal experiments on their minds. The goal is to create the perfect mind-control for financial gain and to subjugate Asuna, whom he intends to marry in the real world, to assume control of her family's corporation. Kirito eventually stops the experiment and rescues the remaining 300 SAO players, foiling Sugou's plans. Before leaving ALO to see Asuna, Kayaba, who has uploaded his mind to the Internet using an experimental and destructively high-power version of NerveGear at the cost of his life, entrusts Kirito with The Seed a package program designed to create virtual worlds. Kazuto eventually reunites with Asuna in the real world after thwarting an attack from Sugou and The Seed is released onto the Internet, reviving Aincrad as other VRMMORPGs begin to thrive. 

One year after the events of SAO, at the prompting of a government official investigating strange occurrences in VR, Kazuto takes on a job to investigate a series of murders involving another VRMMORPG called Gun Gale Online (GGO), the AmuSphere (the successor of the NerveGear), and a player called Death Gun. Aided by a female player named Shino "Sinon" Asada, he participates in a gunfight tournament called the Bullet of Bullets (BoB) and discovers the truth behind the murders, which originated with a player who participated in a player-killing guild in SAO. Through his and Sinon's efforts, two suspects are captured, though the third suspect, Johnny Black, escapes.

Kazuto is later recruited to test an experimental FullDive machine, Soul Translator (STL), which has an interface far more realistic and complex than the previous machine he had played, to help RATH, a research and development organization under the Ministry of Defense (MOD), develop an artificial intelligence named A.L.I.C.E. He tests the STL by entering the Underworld (UW), a virtual reality cyberspace created with The Seed package. In the UW, the flow of time proceeds a thousand times faster than in the real world, and Kirito's memories of what happens inside are restricted. However, when Johnny Black ambushes and mortally wounds Kazuto with suxamethonium chloride, RATH recovers Kazuto and places him back into the STL to preserve his mind while attempts are made to save him. During his time in Underworld, Kirito befriends Eugeo, a carver in a small village of Rulid, and helps him on a journey to save Alice Zuberg, his friend who was taken by a group of highly skilled warriors known as the Integrity Knights for accidentally breaking a rule of the Axiom Church, the leaders of the Human Empire. He and Eugeo soon find themselves uncovering the secrets of the Axiom Church, led by a woman only known as "The Administrator", and the true purpose of Underworld itself, while unbeknownst to them, a war against the opposing Dark Territory is brewing on the horizon. They meet Alice, now an Integrity Knight, and though she does not remember them, Kirito helps her remember her true identity: a form of true artificial intelligence known as A.L.I.C.E. In the battle against the Administrator, Kirito manages to slay her, though Eugeo dies in the process, to Kirito's dismay. 

Meanwhile, in the real world, conflict escalates as American forces raid RATH's facility in the Ocean Turtle in an effort to take A.L.I.C.E. for purposes unknown. Two of the attackers - Gabriel "Vecta" Miller and Vassago "Prince of Hell" Cassals - take control of two Dark Territory characters as they unite the Dark Territory's inhabitants to aid them. With help from all his friends, Kirito manages to stop the attackers as well as foreign players lured by Vassago, and safely extract A.L.I.C.E. from UW, who gains a physical body - with Gabriel and Vassago being killed both virtually and physically in the process. However, Kirito does not log out in time before the flow of time is restored and spends 200 years in UW (about 2 weeks in the real world) with Asuna, who stayed behind for Kirito. After awakening they have their memories of 200 years in underworld removed under Kirito's request, though RATH employee Takeru Higa secretly keeps a backup consciousness of his 200 year self, who have unknown plans for the Underworld.

One month later, Kirito, Asuna, and the others have their accounts forcibly migrated to Unital Ring, a new VRMMORPG which incorporates locations from all the other environments they previously visited, and investigate the cause while meeting some familiar faces.

Production
Reki Kawahara wrote the first volume in 2001 as a competition entry for the 2002 ASCII Media Works , but refrained from submitting it as he had exceeded the page limit; he instead published it as a web novel under the pseudonym Fumio Kunori. Over time, he added three further main arcs and several short stories which, like the first arc "Aincrad", were later adapted into the light novels. In 2008, he participated in the competition again by writing Accel World, this time winning the Grand Prize. Aside from Accel World, he was requested to get his earlier work, Sword Art Online, published by ASCII Media Works. He agreed and withdrew his web novel versions.

For the protagonist Kirito, Kawahara was asked if Kirito's personality and character were based on his own; he answered that he usually does not put aspects of himself into his characters, and jokingly remarked: "but if I had to say there was a point of similarity between Kirito and myself, it is the fact that neither of us are good at forming parties. We [both] tend to play solo in these games a lot." He also noted that the female characters in the story were not based on anyone he knew in the real world, stating: "I don't usually make a character, setting, or anything before I start writing. As I write the story, the girls become what they are now. So, somehow, I don't know exactly, but somehow, my subliminal idea or some hidden emotion creates the characters to be strong and capable." He added that he wrote the series to demonstrate that he views online gaming not as a social ill or escape from real life, but rather decided to show games in a more positive light in his light novels. Kawahara also noted that the character of Asuna might have been created a little too perfectly.

Publication

After Kawahara's request for Sword Art Online to be published was approved, he started working with illustrator abec on the light novel series. The first volume was published in print on April 10, 2009, and 27 volumes have been published as of October 7, 2022. The first eight volumes of the light novel series told the story arcs for Sword Art Online, Alfheim Online, and Gun Gale Online. The Alicization story arc was covered by volumes 9 through 18, while volumes 19 and 20 told a side story called Moon Cradle. Kawahara plans on writing "one more big arc" called Unital Ring that will go back to the real world, and it is the first arc not based on the original web novel. The Unital Ring story arc began in volume 21, which was released in Japan on December 7, 2018.

Kawahara also writes the Sword Art Online: Progressive series, which covers Kirito's adventures on the first few floors of Aincrad. The first volume of Progressive was released on October 10, 2012, and eight volumes have been released as of June 10, 2021. The first volume of a light novel series based on Sword Art Online titled Sword Art Online Alternative Gun Gale Online, written by Keiichi Sigsawa with illustrations by Kouhaku Kuroboshi, was published by ASCII Media Works on December 10, 2014. An original 100-page prequel novel to Sword Art Online The Movie: Ordinal Scale written by Kawahara, titled Hopeful Chant, was released to people who watched the film in Japan during  March 4–10, 2017.

At their Japan Expo USA panel, Yen Press announced the rights to publish the light novels; the first volume was released on April 22, 2014. Yen Press later announced their license of the Sword Art Online: Progressive series, which is scheduled for release in 2015. The novels are also published in China, Taiwan, South Korea, Thailand and Vietnam, with future plans for publications in France, Germany, Italy, Austria, Switzerland and others.

There are a number of dōjinshi (fan works) written by Kawahara under the pseudonym Fumio Kunori, titled . An 80-page assemblage of some of the Material Edition volumes was published on February 13, 2011; another, Material Edition: Remix, was published on September 6, 2019. The latest release is Material Edition volume 29 on May 12, 2019. The author has also created some other dōjinshi including Lisbeth Edition, Silica Edition and Pina Edition under cooperation with Kurusu Tatsuya from ponz.info. It is reported that these dōjinshi gain traction from the involvement of the original author in its creation process, as well as from supplying more details on characters from the original work.

Media

Manga

There are ten manga adaptations of the series, all written by Reki Kawahara and published by ASCII Media Works. , illustrated by Tamako Nakamura, was serialized in Dengeki Bunko Magazine between the September 2010 and May 2012 issues. Two tankōbon volumes of Aincrad were released on September 27, 2012. A comedy four-panel manga, titled  and illustrated by Jūsei Minami, began serialization in the September 2010 issue of Dengeki Bunko Magazine. The first volume of Sword Art Online was released on September 27, 2012. A third manga, titled  and illustrated by Hazuki Tsubasa, began serialization in the May 2012 issue of Dengeki Bunko Magazine. The first volume of Fairy Dance was released on October 27, 2012; the third volume was released on June 27, 2014. The Aincrad and Fairy Dance manga have been acquired for release in North America by Yen Press. The first volume of Aincrad was published on March 25, 2014.

A spin-off manga starring Lisbeth, Silica, and Leafa, titled  and illustrated by Neko Nekobyō, began serialization in the July 2013 issue of Dengeki Bunko Magazine. Following the discontinuation of Dengeki Bunko Magazine in April 2020, the manga was moved to the DenPlay Comic website. Girls Ops was licensed by Yen Press in November 2014, the first volume of which was released on May 19, 2015. A manga adaption of Sword Art Online: Progressive, illustrated by Kiseki Himura, began serialization in the August 2013 issue of Dengeki G's Magazine. The manga ended serialization in the magazine's May 2014 issue and was transferred to Dengeki G's Comic starting with the June 2014 issue. The Progressive manga adaption has been licensed by Yen Press, with the first two volumes released in January and April 2015, respectively.

A sixth manga, titled Sword Art Online: Phantom Bullet and illustrated by Kōtarō Yamada, had its first chapter serialized in the May 2014 issue of Dengeki Bunko Magazine, with following chapters being digitally serialized on Kadokawa's Comic Walker website. A seventh manga, titled Sword Art Online: Calibur and illustrated by Shii Kiya, was serialized in Dengeki G's Comic between the September 2014 and July 2015 issues. A single compilation volume was released on August 10, 2015. An eighth manga, titled Sword Art Online: Mother's Rosario and also by Tsubasa, is based on the seventh volume of the novel series and began serialization in the July 2014 issue of Dengeki Bunko Magazine. A ninth manga, an adaptation of Sword Art Online Alternative Gun Gale Online, began serialization in the November 2015 issue of Dengeki Maoh.

A tenth manga, titled Sword Art Online: Project Alicization and illustrated by Kōtarō Yamada, based on the Alicization arc of the light novel series, began serialization in the September 2016 issue of Dengeki Bunko Magazine. It moved to Web DenPlay Comic due to the discontinuation of Dengeki Bunko Magazine.

Anime series

An anime adaptation of Sword Art Online was announced at Dengeki Bunko Autumn Festival 2011, along with Reki Kawahara's other light novel series, Accel World. The anime is produced by Aniplex and Genco, animated by A-1 Pictures and directed by Tomohiko Ito with music by Yuki Kajiura. The anime aired on Tokyo MX, tvk, TVS, TV Aichi, RKB, HBC and MBS between July 7 and December 22, 2012, and on AT-X, Chiba TV and BS11 at later dates. The series was also streamed on Crunchyroll and Hulu. The anime is adapted from the first four novels and parts of volume eight.

The anime has been licensed in North America by Aniplex of America and an English-language dub premiered on Adult Swim's Toonami from July 27, 2013 to February 15, 2014. The series was released by Aniplex of America in four DVD and Blu-ray sets, with special extras on the BD sets, between August 13 and November 19, 2013. Manga Entertainment released the first series on BD/DVD in the United Kingdom in December 2013, whilst Madman Entertainment released the series in Australia and the English-language version began airing on ABC Me on June 7, 2014. Sword Art Online has been available on Netflix in North America since March 15, 2014.

A year-end special, titled Sword Art Online Extra Edition, aired on December 31, 2013. The special recapped the previously aired anime series and included some new footage. Extra Edition was streamed worldwide a few hours after its airing in Japan. The two-hour-long special was available on Daisuki worldwide except for French-speaking areas, as well as China and Korea. Daisuki offered subtitles in various languages such as English, Spanish, Portuguese, Italian, and German. English-speaking countries, Mexico, Central and South America could also watch the stream on Crunchyroll. Extra Edition was also simulcast in Korea on Aniplus cable channel and in China on the LeTV streaming website. French-speaking countries could watch on the Wakanim streaming website. The Blu-ray Disc and DVD of Extra Edition was released on April 23, 2014 in Japan. The limited edition included a Yui character song titled "Heart Sweet Heart" by Kanae Itō and an original side story written by Kawahara titled .

At the end of the special, the anime television series was confirmed for a second season, titled Sword Art Online II, which premiered on July 5, 2014. The first 14 episodes of the second season are an adaptation of volumes five and six the light novels that cover the Phantom Bullet arc. Episodes 15 to 17 cover the Calibur arc from volume 8 of the novels, with episodes 18 to 24 covering volume 7 of the novels, the Mother's Rosario arc. Premiere screening events of the second season were held in the United States, France, Germany, Hong Kong, Taiwan, Korea and Japan before the television premiere between June 29 and July 4, 2014. At Katsucon, it was announced that the English dub of the second season would air on Toonami beginning March 28, 2015.

The third season of Sword Art Online, titled Sword Art Online: Alicization, and a spin-off anime, titled Sword Art Online Alternative Gun Gale Online, were announced in 2017. Sword Art Online Alternative Gun Gale Online, animated by 3Hz, premiered in April 2018. Sword Art Online: Alicization aired from October 6, 2018 to March 30, 2019, with a one-hour world premiere which aired in Japan, the United States, Australia, France, Germany, Russia and South Korea on September 15, 2018. The English dub of the third season premiered on February 9, 2019 on Toonami. The season was originally announced to air for four cours, and adapt from the novel's ninth volume, Alicization Beginning, to the eighteenth volume, Alicization Lasting. However, the season ended at episode 24 on March 30, 2019 (completing the fourteenth volume of the novel, Alicization Uniting), and continued on October 12, 2019 with a second part titled War of Underworld.  The second half of the War of Underworld series was originally scheduled to premiere in April 2020, but due to the effects of the COVID-19 pandemic in Japan, it was rescheduled to air from July 11 to September 19, 2020.

Music
Yuki Kajiura composed the soundtrack for the Sword Art Online anime, which was later released in the limited edition of the anime's fourth and seventh Blu-ray and DVD volumes. The first volume of the second season's soundtrack was bundled with the limited edition of the season's third and seventh Blu-ray and DVD volumes.

From episode 15 onward, the opening theme is "Innocence" by Eir Aoi, and the ending theme is "Overfly" by Luna Haruna.

For the second season, the first opening theme is "Ignite" by Eir Aoi, and the first ending theme is "Startear" by Haruna. The second opening theme is "Courage" by Tomatsu, and the second ending theme is "No More Time Machine" by LiSA, with the third ending theme being , also by LiSA. The song "Catch the Moment" by LiSA is used as the theme song to Sword Art Online: Ordinal Scale.

The second opening theme is "Resister" by Asca, and the second ending theme is "Forget-me-not" by ReoNa, with episode 19 featuring , also sung by ReoNa.

For the second part of the third season, the first opening theme is "Resolution" by Tomatsu, and the first ending theme is "Unlasting" by LiSA. The second opening theme is "Anima" by ReoNa, and the second ending theme is "I will..." by Eir Aoi. The song  by LiSA was used as the theme song to Sword Art Online Progressive: Aria of a Starless Night, while the song  by Eir Aoi was used as the theme song to Sword Art Online Progressive: Scherzo of Deep Night.

A number of character songs were included in the Blu-ray and DVD volume releases of the anime. These were collected into two compilation albums: Sword Art Online Song Collection, which included character songs released in the season one volumes, was released on August 27, 2014, while Sword Art Online Song Collection II, which included character songs released in the season two volumes, was released on March 22, 2017.

In celebration of the anime's 10th anniversary, the song  was used as the theme song for the commemorative event "Sword Art Online: Full Dive", held on November 6, 2022. The song was composed by Yuki Kajiura and performed by ReoNa, ASCA and Eir Aoi, who were in charge of previous opening and ending themes for the series.

Theatrical films
An animated film titled Sword Art Online The Movie: Ordinal Scale, featuring an original story by Kawahara set after the events of Sword Art Online II, premiered in Japan and Southeast Asia on February 18, 2017, and was released in the United States on March 9, 2017.

After the finale of Sword Art Online: Alicization - War of Underworld, an anime adaptation of Sword Art Online: Progressive was announced. It was later revealed to be a new film titled Sword Art Online Progressive: Aria of a Starless Night, which premiered on October 30, 2021.  Inori Minase is joining the cast as the new character Mito.  Ayako Kōno is directing the film, with Kento Toya designing the characters, Yuki Kajiura returning to compose the music, and A-1 Pictures returning for production.

After the premiere of Sword Art Online Progressive: Aria of a Starless Night, a sequel film titled Sword Art Online Progressive: Scherzo of Deep Night was announced. The film was scheduled for September 10, 2022, but was later delayed due to production issues caused by the COVID-19 pandemic. It is premiered on October 22, 2022.

During the commemorative event "Sword Art Online: Full Dive," a new film project was announced. The project is described as an original work with stories not used in the light novels.

Video games
A stage event at the Dengeki Bunko Autumn Festival 2011 revealed that Reki Kawahara's light novels would get video game adaptations. The first Sword Art Online adaptation, titled , was published by Namco Bandai Games for the PlayStation Portable. The game follows an alternate storyline, in which a glitch causes Kirito and the other players to remain in Sword Art Online despite defeating Heathcliff, and players from other VMMORPGs such as Leafa and Sinon get sucked into the game themselves. The game was released in both regular and limited edition box sets on March 14, 2013.

Sword Art Online: Hollow Fragment is a PlayStation Vita game released in Japan on April 24, 2014. Sword Art Online: Hollow Fragment takes place in the same alternative storyline as Sword Art Online: Infinity Moment, and it includes all content of "Floor Clearing" from that previous game with the addition of new unexplored "Hollow Area" of Aincrad. The protagonist Kirito will cross swords with a mysterious player who would become one of the key characters in the game. The game sold 145,029 physical retail copies within the first week of release in Japan, topping the Japanese software sales charts for that particular week. The game had also been released in Taiwan by Namco Bandai Games Taiwan with Chinese and English subtitles. A digital-only North American, European and Australian release was released in August 2014.

A third video game developed by Artdink and titled Sword Art Online: Lost Song was released in Japan on March 26, 2015 on the PlayStation 3 and Vita platforms, with an English version being released in Asia. The game's producer revealed in October 2014 that the game is an open-world action RPG featuring an original storyline, set within Alfheim Online, where characters are able to fly. The game sold 139,298 physical retail copies on the PlayStation Vita in addition to another 55,090 units on the PlayStation 3 within its first week of release in Japan, ranking second and sixth place respectively within the Japanese software sales charts for that particular week, narrowly behind Bloodborne taking the top spot.

A fourth game titled Sword Art Online: Hollow Realization was released in Japan for the PS4, Vita, and Windows on October 27, 2016 and worldwide on November 8, 2016 for the PS4 and Vita.

A social network game called Sword Art Online: End World was released for Japanese feature phones and smartphones on February 28, 2013 with more than 1 million registered users. It was discontinued in September 2017. Another freemium game for Android and iOS titled Sword Art Online: Code Register launched in 2014, and over 3,000,000 users have downloaded the game. Another game called Sword Art Online: Progress Link designed for the Mobage browser game platform on smartphones was released on February 10, 2015. The game was terminated on July 29, 2016.

Kirito, Asuna, Leafa, Yuuki and SAO Alternative: Gun Gale Online protagonist LLENN appear in Dengeki Bunko: Fighting Climax, a fighting game by Sega featuring various characters from works published under the Dengeki Bunko imprint. A browser game titled Sword Art Quest and its sequel smartphone game, Sword Art Quest II provide challenges to users to upgrade their characters to receive rewards. There is also a paid Android game titled SAO -Log Out- that users can download and play with characters from the series and obtain wallpapers from it.

A virtual reality massive multiplayer online game was in development by Kadokawa and IBM Japan, but was only a demo and will not be released as a full game. 

An action role-playing game titled Accel World vs. Sword Art Online: Millennium Twilight was announced in October 2016. The game is a crossover with Accel World, published by Bandai Namco Entertainment for PlayStation 4, PlayStation Vita, and Windows via Steam, and was released to western audiences on July 7, 2017.

 is a Chinese 3D role-playing game where the player can control 3D characters and experience Sword Art Online, Alfheim Online, and Gun Gale Online. It is developed by Yun Chang Game under Bandai Namco's supervision. The game is being distributed and is operating under Bandai Namco Shanghai, Bandai Namco Entertainment and Qihoo 360 on Chinese platforms. The game was launched on Android on May 26, 2016 and on iOS on June 9, 2016 after a brief period of closed beta, though it is officially still in an "open beta" phase.

Bandai Namco released Sword Art Online: Memory Defrag RPG for Android and iOS in August 2016. It was released outside of Japan on January 24, 2017. Featuring content from the anime series, Ordinal Scale, and some original shorts written for event characters, players are allowed to play solo and progress through the story, or join up with others online to farm special items, equipment, and materials. Common events include ranked challenges against other players, floor clearing, character introductions and seasonal events. Players have the choice of spending real money to speed-up their progress. However, the game was discontinued in August 30, 2021. While Memory Defrag is delisted from the app stores, the game is still available to play via offline version of the app if the person downloaded the game before the termination date.

Bandai Namco released the Sword Art Online: Integral Factor free-to-play MMORPG for Android and iOS in December 2017, created in conjunction with prolific mobile MMO developer . The English version was released in March 2018. It adapts the Aincrad arc starting from Floor 1 and gradually exploring every floor one-by-one. It allows playing as a player-created avatar.

A game based on Gun Gale Online, Sword Art Online: Fatal Bullet, was released for the PlayStation 4, Xbox One and Windows on February 23, 2018.

Bandai Namco Entertainment released the Sword Art Online VR: Lovely Honey Days mobile game for iOS and Android devices in Japan in October 2018. The game's first episode is free-to-play, while the second episode and so on can be purchased as additional content.

Bandai Namco released Sword Art Online Arcade: Deep Explorer in Japanese arcades on March 19, 2019. It is an exploration action RPG that supports up to three players in online co-op and it is the first arcade game in the Sword Art Online series.

A video game based in the Underworld of Project Alicization, Sword Art Online: Alicization Lycoris, was announced by Bandai Namco for release on the PS4, Xbox One, and Windows. The game is also the first game in the franchise to faithfully follow the canon storyline in the initial stage, adapting from Alicization Beginning, volume 9, to Alicization Uniting, volume 14. Following that, the game features a different arc focusing on Medina Orthinanos. Originally, the game was going to be released in May 2020, but it was delayed to July 10, 2020 due to the COVID-19 pandemic.

A China-exclusive mobile MMO, Sword Art Online: Black Swordsman Ace, was released in 2021.

In 2022, the mobile game Sword Art Online: Variant Showdown was released to coincide with the anime's 10th anniversary. In the future it will feature a battle royale mode, a first for an SAO game.

Bandai Namco has announced the video game Sword Art Online: Last Recollection, set to be released worldwide on October 6, 2023. ReoNa will perform the game's theme song, "VITA".

Live-action series

Skydance Television announced on August 2, 2016 that they had acquired the global rights to produce a live-action television adaptation of Sword Art Online light novel series. Laeta Kalogridis has been attached to write a script for the pilot, and will also serve as executive producer for the series alongside Skydance CEO David Ellison, Dana Goldberg, and Marcy Ross. Skydance has stated their intent to "fast-track" the launch of the series, along with plans to follow the TV series with the release of a Sword Art Online virtual reality experience. In February 2018, it was reported that the live-action series had been sold to Netflix.

Reception

Sales
According to Oricon, Sword Art Online was the top selling light novel series of 2012, with eight volumes figuring among the top selling light novels. It was ranked first in the 2012 and 2013 Kono Light Novel ga Sugoi! rankings, as well as top five placement in 2011, 2014, 2015, 2016, 2017, 2018 and top 10 in 2019. It was also the second best selling light novel series in the first half of 2016 in Japan, selling 489,374 copies. Sword Art Online: Progressive sold 321,535 copies in the same time period. As of 2017, the series has an estimated 20 million copies in print worldwide. As of 2021, the series has 26 million copies in print. The number of sales have reached 30 million in 2022.

Critical response
Richard Eisenbeis of Kotaku hails Sword Art Online as the smartest series in recent years, praising its deep insight on the psychological aspects of virtual reality on the human psyche, its sociological views on creating a realistic economy and society in a massively multiplayer online game setting, and the writing staff's ability to juggle a wide variety of genres within the series. Eisenbeis particularly noted how the romance between Kirito and Asuna is explored bringing "definition to exactly what love is like in a virtual world." However, at the time of this preliminary review, he had only watched the first 12 episodes of the series. He has since gone on to review the second half of the series, lauding its excellent use of plot twists and praising its well-written and believable villain. However, he felt that some of the initial positive aspects of the series were lost in the second half, such as the focus on psychological repercussions and social interactions that could be realistically seen in an online game. Criticism was also levied towards the aspect of turning Asuna into a damsel in distress, stating that a female lead as strong as her was "reduced to nothing but the quest item the male lead is hunting for." Eisenbeis closes his review of the series by stating in regards to the two halves, "Both, however, are enjoyable for what they are."

Rebecca Silverman of Anime News Network has criticized the series as having pacing problems, logical gaps and "sloppy writing". Theron Martin of the same website criticized the story as struggling "to achieve and maintain the level of gravitas that life-or-death danger should have", while calling it unwilling to commit to Kirito's "lone wolf" image. DeviceCritique explained that Sword Art Online influences the virtual reality market to grow, and referenced the Oculus Rift as a prime example of the starting point of virtual reality. It also praised Sword Art Online for exploring the psychological and social aspects of virtual reality gaming.

While the anime received criticism in western media, the later light novel arcs, such as Mother's Rosario and Alicization, received praise. Anime News Network reviewer Theron Martin praised many of the volumes of the Alicization arc, saying that the author's writing had improved. Martin also praised the anime adaptation of the Alicization arc, describing the opening episode as "about the best adaptation that could be hoped for of the relevant source material".

Cultural impact
Kirito makes a cameo appearance in the eighth episode of the anime series Eromanga Sensei, with Yoshitsugu Matsuoka reprising his role.

Sword Art Online is sometimes considered to be part of the isekai genre, although Kawahara himself does not agree. The 2012 anime adaptation of Sword Art Online popularized the isekai genre in anime, which led to more isekai web novels being published on the website Shōsetsuka ni Narō ("Let's Become Novelists") and a number of Narō isekai novels being adapted into anime.

Ernest Cline, the writer of 2011 novel Ready Player One, discussed Sword Art Online in an interview, noting how he met its writer Reki Kawahara at an event in Japan where they discussed how they independently developed similar ideas related to virtual reality. It has also been noted that the Phantom Bullet (Gun Gale Online) arc released in print in 2010 depicts an early fictional battle royale game called Bullet of Bullets.

On June 12, 2015, the now-inactive Chinese Ministry of Culture listed Sword Art Online II among 38 anime and manga titles banned in China. In July 2020, Sword Art Online became one of seven manga titles to be removed from Books Kinokuniya in Australia for claims of promoting child pornography.

In the 2020 edition of Kono Light Novel ga Sugoi!, Sword Art Online was voted by the public in an online poll and by a jury (critics, influencers, and other people related to the light novel industry) as the best light novel series of the 2010s, being the first in the ranking with 1,728.95 points.

Notes

References

External links

  
  
 
 

2009 Japanese novels
2012 anime television series debuts
2013 video games
2014 anime television series debuts
2014 video games
2015 video games
2018 anime television series debuts
A-1 Pictures
Adventure anime and manga
Anime and manga based on light novels
Anime composed by Yuki Kajiura
Anime series
Aniplex
Artificial intelligence in fiction
Battle royale anime and manga
Book series introduced in 2002
Book series introduced in 2009
Brain–computer interfacing in fiction
Censored television series
Fiction about death games
Dengeki Bunko
Fiction set in the 2020s
Fictional video games
Isekai anime and manga
Isekai novels and light novels
Kadokawa Dwango franchises
Light novels
Light novels first published online
Mass media franchises
Massively multiplayer online role-playing games in fiction
Muse Communication
Novels set in the 2020s
Science fiction anime and manga
Seinen manga
 
Television series set in the 2020s
Television shows based on light novels
Tokyo MX original programming
Toonami
Video games set in the 2020s
Virtual reality in fiction
Works banned in China
Yen Press titles
Television series set in 2022